The British half crown was a denomination of sterling coinage worth  of one pound, or two shillings and six pence (abbreviated "2/6", familiarly "two and six"), or 30 (old) pence. The half crown was first issued in 1549, in the reign of Edward VI. No half crowns were issued in the reign of Mary, but from the reign of Elizabeth I half crowns were issued in every reign except that of Edward VIII, until the coins were discontinued in 1970.

The half crown was demonetised (ahead of other pre-decimal coins) on 1 January 1970, the year before the United Kingdom adopted decimal currency on Decimal Day. During the English Interregnum of 1649–1660, a republican half crown was issued, bearing the arms of the Commonwealth of England, despite monarchist associations of the coin's name. When Oliver Cromwell was made Lord Protector of England, half crowns were issued bearing his portrait depicting him wearing a laurel wreath in the manner of a Roman Emperor. The half crown did not display its value on the reverse until 1893. In the 20th century a slang term for the coin was "half-a-dollar".

History of the half crown by reign 

King Henry VIII 1526: the first English half crown was struck in gold.
King Edward VI 1551: issued the first half crown in silver. The coin was dated and showed the king riding a horse.
Queen Mary I: the half crown was struck on Mary's marriage to Philip II of Spain in 1554 but was never issued for circulation. Three specimens exist.
Queen Elizabeth I: gold half crowns were issued again. At the end of the reign silver half crowns were issued.
King James I: gold half crowns were issued again. During the reign silver half crowns were issued.
King Charles I: silver half crowns were issued, including those struck as obsidional money, money of necessity during the Civil War period.
Commonwealth of England: Oliver Cromwell silver half crowns were issued. During the years 1656 and 1658 milled half crowns were issued of Oliver Cromwell.
King Charles II 1663–1685: silver half crowns were issued, and this period saw the end of the hammered issue of half crowns.
King James II 1685–1688: silver half crown.
King William III & Queen Mary II 1689–1694: silver half crown.
William III of England 1694–1702: silver half crown.
Queen Anne 1702–1714: silver half crown.
King George I 1714–1727: silver half crown.
King George II 1727–1760: silver half crown.
King George III 1760–1820: silver half crown.
King George IV 1820–1830: silver half crown.
King William IV 1830–1837: silver half crown.
Queen Victoria 1837–1901: silver half crown.
King Edward VII 1902–1910: silver half crown.
King George V 1910–1936: silver half crown, sterling silver (92½% silver) until 1919, then 50% silver.
King Edward VIII 1936: 50% silver half crown. Not issued for circulation.
King George VI 1937–1952: 50% silver half crowns were issued until 1946 when the metal was changed to cupro-nickel.
Queen Elizabeth II 1953–1967: the last half crown for general circulation was issued in 1967, and the coin was withdrawn in 1970, before decimalisation. Proof sets of £sd coins, including the halfcrown, were issued by the Royal Mint, bearing the date 1970.

Size and weight 
From 1816, in the reign of George III, half crown coins had a diameter of 32 mm and a weight of 14.14 grams (defined as  troy ounce), dimensions which remained the same for the half crown until decimalisation in 1971.

Mintages 
The mintage figures below are taken from the annual UK publication Coin Yearbook.

Gallery

See also 

 Half crown (Irish coin)

References

External links 
 – View coins from the Commonwealth of England period, 1649–1660, including halfcrowns.
British Coins – Free information about British coins (from 1656 to 1952). Includes an online forum.
Coins of the UK – A full history of the half crown.
The History of the Half-crown
Halfcrown, Coin Type from United Kingdom – Online Coin Club

Pre-decimalisation coins of the United Kingdom
Coins of the United Kingdom
Coins of Great Britain
Coins of England
Crown (currency)